WMOR-FM (106.1 FM) is a radio station broadcasting an adult hits format. The station is licensed to Morehead, Kentucky, United States. The station is owned by Morgan County Industries, Inc.

References

External links

MOR